The Wíčazo Ša Review ("Red Pencil" in Lakota) is a biannual peer-reviewed academic journal of Native American studies. The journal was established in 1985 by editors-in-chief Elizabeth Cook-Lynn (Dakota Santee), Dr. Beatrice Medicine (Lakota), Roger Buffalohead (Ponca), and Dr. William Willard (Cherokee). Wíčazo Ša Review is published by the University of Minnesota Press, which acquired it in 1999. Originally, it was published at Eastern Washington University, under the guidance of its Native American Studies center. Issues include essays, articles, interviews, reviews, poems, short stories, course outlines, curriculum designs, scholarly research and literary criticism reflective of Native American studies and related fields. The current editor is Dr. Lloyd L. Lee (enrolled Navajo Nation citizen) of the University of New Mexico, who took over the position from James Riding In (Arizona State University).

External links 
 

Indigenous rights publications
American studies journals
Native American studies
Publications established in 1985
Biannual journals
1985 establishments in Minnesota
University of Minnesota
English-language journals
Native Americans in Minnesota